The Wrong Box is a black comedy novel co-written by Robert Louis Stevenson and Lloyd Osbourne, first published in 1889. The story is about two brothers who are the last two surviving members of a tontine.
 
The book was the first of three novels that Stevenson co-wrote with Osbourne, who was his stepson. The others were The Wrecker (1892) and The Ebb-Tide (1894). Osbourne wrote the first draft of the novel late in 1887 (then called The Finsbury Tontine), Stevenson revised it in 1888 (then called A Game of Bluff) and again in 1889 when it was finally called The Wrong Box.  A film adaptation, also titled The Wrong Box, was released in 1966, and a musical in 2002.

Literary significance and reception
Rudyard Kipling, in a letter to his friend Edmonia Hill (dated September 17, 1889), praised the novel:

Adaptation
The Wrong Box was filmed in 1966 starring Michael Caine.  The novel was also adapted as a stage musical in 2002, and a studio cast recording of the show was released in August 2013.

References

External links

 

1889 British novels
Novels by Robert Louis Stevenson
Black comedy books
British novels adapted into films
Collaborative novels
Scottish novels